Simo Baćović (1828 – 4 September 1911) was a Montenegrin voivode born in Banjani.

He was a general of the rebels during the Vukalović's Uprising, he blockaded Ottoman garrisons in cities of Trebinje and Gacko. He also commanded Montenegrin divisions during Herzegovina uprising and Montenegrin–Ottoman War (1876–1878). He led his division to victory in Battle of Vučji Do.

References 

1828 births
Montenegrin generals
1911 deaths
Date of birth missing
People from Sokolac
Place of birth missing
19th-century Montenegrin people